Shri Andal Alagar College of Engineering (SAACE) is a private college founded by the Indian actor and politician Vijayakanth. The college was established in 2001.

External links 
 

Engineering colleges in Chennai
Colleges affiliated to Anna University
Educational institutions established in 2001
2001 establishments in Tamil Nadu